"S.P.D." is  Speed's 16th single under the Sonic Groove label,  released on May 27, 2009. The title is an acronym for "Splendid Pop Dance". The concept of the single is to introduce a brand new Speed with a new sound courtesy of foreign writers. It is their second single to be neither written nor produced by producer Hiromasa Ijichi.

Track list

CD

DVD

Chart performance

References 

2009 singles
Speed (Japanese band) songs
2009 songs